WGAG-LP is a variety/adult hits formatted broadcast radio station licensed to and serving Princeton, West Virginia.

WGAG-LP is owned and operated by The Denver Foundation, Inc., founded by Bob Denver who played the title character on Gilligan's Island (the station is branded as "Little Buddy Radio", a reference to Gilligan's nickname).

External links
 Little Buddy Radio Online
 Little Buddy Radio live stream
 

GAG-LP
GAG-LP
Radio stations established in 2004
2004 establishments in West Virginia
Adult hits radio stations in the United States